Since the 1907–1908 New Zealand rugby tour of Australia and Great Britain, where the New Zealand side participated in the first ever rugby league test matches, the New Zealand Kiwis have participated in over 300 tests. Historically matches have been played in three or two match tours but recently one–off tests and tournaments such as the Four Nations have become more popular. New Zealand won the Tri–Nations in 2005, the World Cup in 2008 and the Four Nations in 2010 and 2014.

All-time records

Test series & tours by year

Notes

References
Coffey and Wood The Kiwis: 100 Years of International Rugby League

External links
Official NZRL Test records at nzrl.co.nz
New Zealand results at rugbyleagueproject.org
Kiwi Test Matches at nzleague.co.nz

New Zealand national rugby league team
New Zealand rugby league lists